14th National Board of Review Awards
December 24, 1942
The 14th National Board of Review Awards were announced on 24 December 1942.

Best English Language Films
In Which We Serve
One of Our Aircraft Is Missing
Mrs. Miniver
Journey for Margaret
Wake Island
The Male Animal
The Major and the Minor
Sullivan's Travels
The Moon and Sixpence
The Pied Piper

Winners
Best English Language Films: In Which We Serve
Best Documentary: Moscow Strikes Back
Best Acting:
Ernest Anderson - In This Our Life
Florence Bates - The Moon and Sixpence
James Cagney - Yankee Doodle Dandy
Jack Carson - The Male Animal
Charles Coburn - In This Our Life, Kings Row and H. M. Pulham, Esq.
Greer Garson - Mrs. Miniver and Random Harvest
Sydney Greenstreet - Across the Pacific
William Holden - The Remarkable Andrew
Tim Holt - The Magnificent Ambersons
Glynis Johns - The Invaders
Gene Kelly - For Me and My Gal
Ida Lupino - Moontide
Diana Lynn - The Major and the Minor
Hattie McDaniel - In This Our Life
Bernard Miles - In Which We Serve
John Mills - In Which We Serve
Thomas Mitchell - Moontide
Agnes Moorehead - The Magnificent Ambersons
Margaret O'Brien - Journey for Margaret
Susan Peters - Random Harvest
Edward G. Robinson - Tales of Manhattan
Ginger Rogers - Roxie Hart and The Major and the Minor
George Sanders - The Moon and Sixpence
William Severn - Journey for Margaret
Ann Sheridan - Kings Row
Rudy Vallée - The Palm Beach Story
Anton Walbrook - The Invaders
Googie Withers - One of Our Aircraft Is Missing
Monty Woolley - The Pied Piper
Teresa Wright - Mrs. Miniver
Robert Young - H. M. Pulham, Esq., Journey for Margaret and Joe Smith, American

Notes

External links
National Board of Review of Motion Pictures :: Awards for 1942

1942
1942 film awards
1942 in American cinema